Weil may refer to:

Places in Germany
Weil, Bavaria 
Weil am Rhein, Baden-Württemberg
Weil der Stadt, Baden-Württemberg
Weil im Schönbuch, Baden-Württemberg

Other uses
 Weil (river), Hesse, Germany
 Weil (surname), including people with the surname Weill, Weyl
 Doctor Weil (Mega Man Zero), a fictional character from the Mega Man Zero video game series
 Weil-Marbach, now the Marbach Stud in Baden-Württemberg

See also
 Weill (disambiguation)
 Weil, Gotshal & Manges, law firm founded in the United States
 Weil's disease